The 2019 Canterbury City Council election took place on 2 May 2019 to elect members of the Canterbury City Council in Kent, England. This was on the same day as other local elections. The Conservative Party retained overall control of the council.

Summary

Election result

|-

Results by Ward

Barton

Beltinge

Blean Forest

 

George Metcalfe was elected as a Conservative in 2015. The change in voteshare is shown from his result then, rather than the Liberal Democrat candidate.

Chartham and Stone Street

Chestfield

Gorrell

Greenhill

Herne & Broomfield

Heron

Little Stour & Adisham

Nailbourne

Northgate

Reculver

Seasalter

St Stephen's

Sturry

Swalecliffe

Tankerton

West Bay

Westgate

Wincheap

By-elections

Swalecliffe

Westgate

Gorrell

References

2019 English local elections
May 2019 events in the United Kingdom
2019
2010s in Kent